The 1983–84 FIBA European Cup Winners' Cup was the eighteenth edition of FIBA's 2nd-tier level European-wide professional club basketball competition, contested between national domestic cup champions, running from 27 September 1983, to 14 March 1984. It was contested by 24 teams, five more than in the previous edition.

Real Madrid defeated Simac Milano, in the final held in Ostend, winning its first FIBA European Cup Winners' Cup.

Participants

First round

|}

*Al-Zamalek withdrew before the first leg, and Landys&Gyr Wien received a forfeit (2-0) in both games.

Second round

|}

Automatically qualified to the Quarter finals group stage
 Scavolini Pesaro (title holder)
 Real Madrid

Quarterfinals

Semifinals

|}

Final
March 14, Stedelijk Sportcentrum, Ostend

|}

References

External links 
FIBA European Cup Winner's Cup 1983–84 linguasport.com
FIBA European Cup Winner's Cup 1983–84

FIBA
FIBA Saporta Cup